North Columbia may refer to:

North Columbia, California
North Columbia, New York
North Columbia Academy